Milica Špikić (born 28 March 1991 in Jagodina, SFR Yugoslavia) is a former Serbian professional basketball player. In career she played for Partizan, Stara Pazova and Radnički Kragujevac.

Honours
Partizan 
 National Cup of Serbia (2): 2010–11, 2017–18

References

External links
 Profile at eurobasket.com

1991 births
Living people
Sportspeople from Jagodina
Serbian women's basketball players
ŽKK Partizan players
Shooting guards